Yayma Boulet Peillon (born April 14, 1983 in Havana) is a women's basketball player from Cuba. Playing as a center she twice won a medal with the Cuba women's national basketball team at the Pan American Games during her career.

References

FIBA Profile

1983 births
Living people
Cuban women's basketball players
Basketball players from Havana
Basketball players at the 2003 Pan American Games
Basketball players at the 2007 Pan American Games
Pan American Games gold medalists for Cuba
Pan American Games bronze medalists for Cuba
Pan American Games medalists in basketball
Central American and Caribbean Games gold medalists for Cuba
Competitors at the 2006 Central American and Caribbean Games
Centers (basketball)
Central American and Caribbean Games medalists in basketball
Medalists at the 2003 Pan American Games
Medalists at the 2007 Pan American Games
20th-century Cuban women
20th-century Cuban people
21st-century Cuban women